Jerry Eugene Baker (born March 6, 1960) is a former American football defensive tackle who played in five games for the Denver Broncos during the 1983 National Football League season. He played college football at Tulane University.

References 

1960 births
Living people
American football defensive tackles
Tulane Green Wave football players
Denver Broncos players
Sportspeople from Bartow, Florida